Michelle Zonato Nicolini or Michelle Nicolini (born January 5, 1982) is a Brazilian Jiu-Jitsu practitioner and mixed martial artist (MMA). Among the most accomplished female grapplers of all time,  Nicolini holds third place for most IBJJF World Championship titles, with eight wins. She is a member of the IBJJF Hall of Fame.

Grappling Career 
Nicolini was born in the city of Itú in Brazil. At the age of 14 she started Capoeira stopping 3 years later to focus on jiu-jitsu, training under Robert Drysdale, who she received her black belt from.
In 2015 she competed twice at Polaris Pro Grappling beating Angelica Galvao via toehold and losing to Gezary Matuda via armbar. 

Nicolini was scheduled to compete against Ffion Davies at Polaris 21 on September 24, 2022, for the promotion's inaugural bantamweight title Davies withdrew from the match and was replaced by Ashley Bendle on short notice. Nicolini defeated Bendle by split decision and won the Polaris bantamweight title.

Brazilian Jiu-Jitsu competitive summary 

In the major IBJJF gi championships at black belt level she is a:-

8x World Championship champion
3x Pan-American Championship champion
3x European Championship champion
3x Brazilian Nationals champion

2022 European Master 1 Lightweight Champion

In the major IBJJF Nogi championships at black belt level she is a:-

4x World Nogi Championship champion
2x Pan Ams Nogi Championship champion
2x Euros Nogi Championship champion

She is also a 4x ADCC medal winner – 1x Gold, 2x Silver and 1x Bronze.

By winning the Brazilian Nationals Nogi Championship Michelle would become the first female athlete to complete a clean sweep of winning a gold medal at black belt level in both gi and no-gi at all four major championships.

Mixed martial arts career

Early career 
Nicolini was scheduled to face Cristina Meija at Inka FC 11 on June 23, 2011, in her mixed martial arts debut. She won the fight by a first-round submission.

Nicolini was scheduled to face Lanchana Green at M4TC 13: Nemesis on February 22, 2014. She won the fight by a first-round submission.

Nicolini was scheduled to face Norma Rueda Center at Legacy FC 36 October 17, 2014. Nicolini suffered her first professional loss, as Norma won by unanimous decision.

ONE Championship 
On July 25, 2016, it was revealed that Nicolini had signed with the Singapore-based fight promotion ONE Championship.

Nicolini was scheduled to face Mona Samir at ONE Championship: Defending Honor on November 16, 2016. She won the fight by a first-round submission.

Nicolini was scheduled to face Irina Mazepa at ONE Championship: Kings of Destiny on April 21, 2017. She won the fight by a first-round submission.

Nicolini was scheduled to face Iryna Kyselova at ONE Championship: Visions of Victory on March 8, 2018. She won the fight by a first-round submission.

Nicolini was scheduled to face Tiffany Teo, in a ONE strawweight title eliminator, at ONE Championship: Heart of the Lion on November 9, 2018. Teo won the fight by unanimous decision, handing Nicolini her second professional loss.

Nicolini was scheduled to face the reigning ONE Women's Atomweight champion Angela Lee, in a strawweight bout, at ONE Championship: Masters of Destiny on July 12, 2019. Despite coming into the bout as an underdog, and being on the receiving end of several uncalled fouls, Nicolini won the fight by unanimous decision.

Nicolini challenged the reigning ONE Women's Strawweight World champion Xiong Jingnan at ONE Championship: Empower on September 3, 2021. It was originally scheduled for May 28, 2021, before being postponed due to COVID-19. She lost the bout via unanimous decision, unable to get her opponent to the ground and losing the striking exchanges.

Mixed martial arts record 

|-
| Loss
| align=center|6–3
| Xiong Jingnan
| Decision (unanimous)
| ONE Championship: Empower
| 
| align=center|5
| align=center|5:00
| Kallang, Singapore
| 
|-
|Win
|align=center| 6–2
|Angela Lee
|Decision (unanimous)
| ONE Championship: Masters of Destiny
||
|align=center| 3
|align=center| 5:00
|Kuala Lumpur , Malaysia
|
|-
| Loss
| align=center|5–2
| Tiffany Teo
| Decision (unanimous)
| ONE Championship: Heart of the Lion
| 
| align=center| 3
| align=center| 5:00
| Kallang, Singapore
|
|-
| Win
| align=center| 5–1
| Iryna Kyselova
| Submission (rear naked choke)
| ONE Championship: Visions of Victory
| 
| align=center|1
| align=center|2:26
|Kuala Lumpur, Malaysia
|
|-
| Win
| align=center| 4–1
| Irina Mazepa
| Submission (armbar)
| ONE Championship: Kings of Destiny
| 
| align=center|1
| align=center|2:11
|Manila, Philippines
|
|-
| Win
| align=center| 3–1
| Mona Samir
| Submission (rear-naked choke)
| ONE Championship: Defending Honor
| 
| align=center|1
| align=center|2:16
|Kallang, Singapore
|
|-
| Loss
| align=center| 2–1
| Norma Rueda Center
| Decision (unanimous)
| Legacy FC 36
| 
| align=center|3
| align=center|5:00
|Albuquerque, New Mexico
|
|-
| Win
| align=center| 2–0
| Lanchana Green
| Submission (armbar)
| M4TC 13: Nemesis
| 
| align=center|1
| align=center|2:27
|Tyne and Wear, England
|
|-
| Win
| align=center| 1–0
| Cristina Meija
| Submission (armbar)
| Inka FC 11
| 
| align=center|1
| align=center|2:36
|Santiago de Surco, Peru
|
|-

See also 
List of current ONE fighters

References

External links 
 Michelle Nicolini at ONE
 
 Michelle Nicolini at BJJ Heroes

1982 births
Living people
Brazilian female mixed martial artists
Brazilian practitioners of Brazilian jiu-jitsu
People awarded a black belt in Brazilian jiu-jitsu
Female Brazilian jiu-jitsu practitioners
Strawweight mixed martial artists
Bantamweight mixed martial artists
Mixed martial artists utilizing Brazilian jiu-jitsu
Sportspeople from São Paulo
People from Itu, São Paulo
Brazilian jiu-jitsu world champions (women)
World No-Gi Brazilian Jiu-Jitsu Championship medalists
IBJJF Hall of Fame inductees
Brazilian jiu-jitsu practitioners who have competed in MMA (women)
ADCC Submission Fighting World Champions (women)